= Boundary Lake (California) =

- Location within California Location within the United States
- Location: Tuolumne County, California
- Coordinates: 38.089°N 119.790°W
- Type: Lake
- Surface elevation: 7,529 feet (2,295 m)

Boundary Lake is a lake in Tuolumne County, California, in the United States.

Boundary Lake was likely named from its location at the edge of Yosemite National Park.

== See also ==
- List of lakes in California
